Ambako Avtandilovich Vachadze (born 17 March 1983 in Kutaisi) is a Georgian male Greco-Roman wrestler who competes for Russia.

References 
 
 bio on fila-wrestling.com

Living people
1983 births
Russian male sport wrestlers
World Wrestling Championships medalists
European Wrestling Championships medalists
Male sport wrestlers from Georgia (country)